Kahrar, also rendered as Qahrar, may refer to:
Kahrar-e Dejgah
Kahrar-e Mowqufeh
Kahrar-e Olya
Kahrar-e Sofla